The Community for Social Justice People's Party, abbreviated to KTI, is a Hungarian party and political alliance of several parties and civic organizations for the 2014 parliamentary election. The party was founded and led by MP Katalin Szili, a former Speaker of the National Assembly of Hungary. Another MP Gábor Ivády joined KTI.

Members
The alliance consisted of the following organizations in October 2013: Social Union (SZU), Centre Party, Association Community for Carpathian Basin Life, Association of European Conservative Hungarians, Party of Hungarian Future, Hungarian Autonomous People's Party, Hungarian Social Forum, Association for Hungarian Regions (MARÉG), Peyer Károly Foundation, Advocacy Association for Citizens of Zugló, Association of Chance for Renewal and Movement for a People-oriented Country.

History
In October 2013, 12 parties and civil organizations, on the initiative of Katalin Szili and her party, the Social Union (SZU), established an electoral alliance for the 2014 general election, called Community for Social Justice People's Party (KTI). According to the party's founding decree, KTI seeks to "give a chance to those people who cannot chose from existing parties, including Hungary's nearly 4 million poor whom nobody cares for". Szili also said "there was a tremendous need for a political alternative organised on a democratic and national basis. All political forces are at war with each other, leaving the problems of the impoverished masses unresolved."

Footnotes

External links
Official web site

Political party alliances in Hungary
Political parties in Hungary
Political parties established in 2013
2013 establishments in Hungary